Valentín Gómez Farías (1781 – 1858) was the President of Mexico for five  short and non-consecutive periods.

Gómez Farías may also refer to:

Places
 Gómez Farías Municipality, Chihuahua
 Gómez Farías Municipality, Jalisco
 Gómez Farías Municipality, Tamaulipas
 Otumba de Gómez Farías, State of Mexico
 Valentín Gómez Farías, Chihuahua
 Gómez Farías metro station, a station on Line 1 of the Mexico City Metro